Nobody Else but You is a 2011 French comedy crime mystery film, written and directed by Gérald Hustache-Mathieu. It stars Jean-Paul Rouve as a bestselling crime novelist who is desperately looking for a new story hones his focus on the apparent suicide of a small-town woman, a local celebrity, whose life mirrors that of Marilyn Monroe, played by Sophie Quinton.

The film was shot on 35 mm film stock in Doubs, France, including the church of the village at the center of the story, Mouthe. It was released on 12 January 2011 in France, and on 11 May 2012 in United States. It grossed over $43,000 in the US, and received positive reviews from critics, some of whom compared it favorably to Fargo, Twin Peaks and Laura.

The film's titles (French and English) are references to the song "I Wanna Be Loved by You" which sung by Monroe in the film Some Like It Hot.

Plot
Traveling to the village of his aunt to hear the reading of her will, David Rousseau, an author of crime novels, investigates the death of a beautiful young woman named Candice, an apparent suicide in Mouthe. As he investigates Candice's death, the plot of the movie slowly reveals that it is an allegory of the life and death of Marilyn Monroe. Rousseau refuses to believe she has committed suicide. Teaming up with a local policeman, he seeks to prove that Candice was murdered.

Cast 
 Jean-Paul Rouve as David Rousseau
 Sophie Quinton as Candice Lecoeur
 Guillaume Gouix as Bruno Leloup
 Arsinée Khanjian as Juliette Geminy
 Joséphine de Meaux as Cathy
 Olivier Rabourdin as Commandant Colbert
 Éric Ruf as Simon Denner
 Clara Ponsot as Betty
 Finnegan Oldfield as Richi
 Anne Le Ny as the voice of Victoria
 Antoine Michel as Fireman
 Nicolas Duvauchelle as the voice of Fred

Critical reception 
On review aggregation website Rotten Tomatoes, the film has an approval rating of 83% based on 30 reviews, and an average rating of 6.7/10. On Metacritic, which assigns a normalized rating to reviews, the film has a score of 63 out of 100 based on 10 critics, indicating "generally favorable reviews".

Accolades

References

External links 

2010s crime comedy films
French crime comedy films
2011 comedy films
2011 films
Films about modeling
2010s French films